Halle railway station may refer to:

Halle Hauptbahnhof in Germany
Halle (Westf) station in Germany
Halle railway station, Belgium